Security Square Mall is a mall in Woodlawn, Baltimore County, Maryland, a suburb of Baltimore, in the United States. The mall features over 100 stores and restaurants, as well as a food court. One section of the mall, Grand Village Plaza (formerly JCPenney), previously included Korean shops and restaurants; however, most of these establishments had closed by 2010. Security Square Mall is located adjacent to the North American School of Trades. The anchor stores are Bayit Furniture, Set the Captives Free Outreach Center, Burlington, and Macy's. There is 1 vacant anchor store that was once Sears.

History

Anchor stores
Security Square Mall opened in 1972. Original anchors were Sears and Hochschild Kohn's which sold its store to Hutzler's, who closed the store in 1989, and subsequently sold it to Montgomery Ward, which moved from a location on U.S. Route 40 in Catonsville that is now occupied by Walmart. The mall was built by the Edward J. DeBartolo corporation but sold to JMB Urban Realty in 1983. Hecht's opened an anchor store in a new building in August 1979.

Woolworth closed in 1997 and was replaced with Burlington Coat Factory. Montgomery Ward closed in 2001 and became Modell's Sporting Goods three years later.

JCPenney closed its store at Security Square in 2001 due to declining sales. Two years later, the two-story JCPenney space was converted to Seoul Plaza, a "mall within a mall" consisting of several Korean shops and restaurants, as well as a Grand Mart supermarket.  The Grand Mart closed in May 2008. Modell's closed in mid-2008. In 2005, home goods retailer Anna's Linens opened its first Maryland store at Security Square. One year later, Hecht's was converted to Macy's.

In 2018, Seoul Plaza was renamed to Grand Village Plaza.

On August 6, 2019, it was announced that Sears would be closing in October 2019 as part of a plan to close 26 stores nationwide which left Burlington and Macy's as the only anchors left.

in July 2021, a shooting occurred at the facility.

Renovations
Privately held realty company Capital Investment Associates purchased Security Square Mall and hired Hicks & Rotner Retail, Inc. to manage leasing.  The next year, as part of its plan to revitalize, and make an upscale shift in the mall, the new management team signed eight new retailers including Hecht's (a relocation from its closed store in Edmondson Village).  It also redesigned other parts of the mall including the food court (in the former space of the GC cinemas that had moved to a new standalone building on the south parking lot), restrooms, and landscaping.

In 1999, the mall increased security measures throughout, including the relocation of the security offices to center court.

On April 26, 2022, local and state leaders announced major funding for the effort of a $20 million revitalization of the area around the mall.

Transportation
Security Square Mall is very close to Baltimore Beltway's Exit 17.

The parking lot of the mall is a hub for several Maryland Transit Administration bus routes. Some routes operate to other nearby locations between 1 AM and 6 AM when the mall's bus stop is closed.

References

External links

Security Square Mall's "Seoul Plaza" footage

Shopping malls in Maryland
Shopping malls established in 1972
Baltimore County, Maryland landmarks
Buildings and structures in Baltimore County, Maryland
Tourist attractions in Baltimore County, Maryland
Woodlawn, Baltimore County, Maryland
1972 establishments in Maryland